Nova Vas pri Lescah is a settlement near Lesce in the Municipality of Radovljica in the Upper Carniola region of Slovenia.

Name
The name of the settlement was changed from Nova vas to Nova vas pri Lescah in 1955.

References

External links
Nova Vas pri Lescah at Geopedia

Populated places in the Municipality of Radovljica